Pyrausta surinamensis is a moth in the family Crambidae. It is found in Suriname.

References

Moths described in 1882
surinamensis
Moths of South America